The 1979 Champion Spark Plug 400 was a NASCAR Winston Cup Series event that took place on August 19, 1979, at Michigan International Speedway in Brooklyn, Michigan.

Background
Opened in 1968, the track's turns are banked at eighteen degrees, while the 3,600-foot-long front stretch, the location of the finish line, is banked at twelve degrees. The back stretch, has a five degree banking and is 2,242 feet long.

Race report
There were 36 American-born male drivers on the grid.

Richard Petty defeated Buddy Baker by one second in essentially a fuel mileage race that determined whoever could preserve the most fuel. There were 21 lead changes and five caution flags for 35 laps; making the race three hours and four minutes long. Blackie Wangerin would receive the last-place finish due to a crash with H.B. Bailey on lap 2 which resulted in Wangerin's car flipping outside of the track. John Anderson got his only top five finish in his Cup debut.

Al Rudd, Jr. would race his only NASCAR event here. The entire purse was $142,905 ($ when adjusted for inflation). Notable crew chiefs for this race were Buddy Parrott, Joey Arrington, Kirk Shelmerdine, Darrell Bryant, Dale Inman, Harry Hyde, Bud Moore, Tim Brewer, and Jake Elder.

Jan Opperman, in a car owned by Will Cronkite was the only driver to not qualify.

Qualifying

Failed to qualify: Jan Opperman (#96)

Finishing order

Standings after the race

References

Champion Spark Plug 400
Champion Spark Plug 400
NASCAR races at Michigan International Speedway